Room of One's Own may refer to:

A Room of One's Own, 1929 essay by Virginia Woolf
Room (magazine), formerly Room of One's Own, a Canadian quarterly literary journal 
A Room of One's Own, a feminist bookstore in Madison, Wisconsin